Rechberghausen is a town in the district of Göppingen in Baden-Württemberg in southern Germany.

Geography

Geographical location
The community lies in on the foothills of the central Swabian Jura and on the edge of the eastern Schurwald. The height is  DE-NN.

Neighbouring communities
In the northwest the municipality borders to Börtlingen, in the northeast to  Birenbach. Eastern and south-eastern neighbour is the county seat Göppingen, with its Bartenbach district, the western neighbour is the community Wangen (Göppingen). All are located in the district of Göppingen.

History 
The place was first mentioned in 1245. He was then the Dukes of Teck after the local castle had previously probably heard the Lords of Rechberghausen.

Religions
Till  the seventies of the 20th century, the Catholics had a great majority. Today there is a very active  evangelical community. The Catholic Church Mariä Himmelfahrt was consecrated  in 1912, the evangelic Jesus Christus Kirche in 1961.

Inhabitants 
The development between 1837 and 2010.

Source: Statistical Office Stuttgart

Mayor
Mayor was from December 1, 1977, to June 30, 2015, Reiner Johannes Ruf.
Since July 1, 2015 Claudia Dörner is the new mayor in Rechberghausen.

References

Towns in Baden-Württemberg
Göppingen (district)